Marilyn Denis (born July 1, 1958) is a Canadian television and radio personality. Denis is the host of The Marilyn Denis Show and co-host of CHUM-FM's Marilyn Denis and Jamar.

Early life and education
Born in Edmonton, Alberta, she grew up in Pittsburgh, Pennsylvania and received a bachelor's degree in radio, television and advertising from the University of Idaho.

Career
Marilyn began her broadcasting career at a local radio station in Moscow, Idaho, and later moved to Calgary where she worked at CHFM & CJAY-FM. In addition, she was a sports and entertainment reporter and weather announcer at CFCN-TV and TSN.

From July 2, 1986 until present, Denis has been one of the co-hosts of CHUM-FM's morning show. Originally titled Roger, Rick and Marilyn, co-hosting with Roger Ashby and Rick Hodge, then Roger and Marilyn after the departure of Hodge in June 2008 (Hodge's replacement, Darren B. Lamb, departed from the station in September 2015) until Ashby's retirement in December 2018 and is currently titled Marilyn Denis and Jamar. 

From September 1989 to May 2008, she also hosted the syndicated daytime talk show Cityline on Citytv and A-Channel.

With the CTVglobemedia purchase of CHUM Limited, and the subsequent sale of five Citytv stations to Rogers Media, mandated by the Canadian Radio-television and Telecommunications Commission, Denis temporarily found herself working for two separate media competitors. To resolve this situation, Denis announced that she would be leaving Cityline after 19 years to pursue current and future projects with the CTV Television Network. Denis hosted her last show on May 23, 2008.

In June 2008, Denis announced she would be hosting a new show, The Marilyn Denis Show, on CTV, which was scheduled to premiere in fall 2010. However, due to studio construction, the program premiered on January 10, 2011 on CTV. As of January 2022, she continues to host her highly regarded national show.

Denis was awarded an honorary PhD in Humane Letters from her alma mater, the University of Idaho. Denis  also delivered the commencement speech at the University of Idaho on May 13, 2017.

Personal life
Denis resides in downtown Toronto. On May 8, 2018, Marilyn announced that she was engaged to her high-school prom date, Jim Helman. They married on June 19, 2018.

Her son, Adam Wylde (born 1988) is the morning host with TJ and Jax Irwin, at Bell Media's CKFM-FM in Toronto, and the CEO, Head of Content & Partnerships at the Steve Dangle Podcast Network.

Awards
In 2005 and 2006, Marilyn won the Viewer's Choice Award at the Gemini Awards. In 2007, Denia won the Gemini for Best Host in a Lifestyle/Information series for Cityline.

The Marilyn Denis Show was awarded Best Talk Program at the 2016 and 2018 Canadian Screen Awards.

In 2006, Marilyn was honoured with Canadian Music Week's "Rosalie Award", named after Canadian radio pioneer Rosalie Trombley, best known as radio programmer for radio station CKLW in Windsor. In 2017, Denis became the first female broadcaster to receive the Allan Waters Lifetime Achievement Award, presented at Canadian Music Week during the Canadian Music and Broadcast Industry Awards in Toronto.

References

1958 births
Living people
American radio personalities
American television talk show hosts
Canadian radio hosts
Canadian television talk show hosts
People from Edmonton
Radio personalities from Pittsburgh
University of Idaho alumni
Canadian women television personalities
CTV Television Network people
Canadian women radio hosts